Pranav Venkatesh is an Indian chess grandmaster.

Chess career
Pranav began playing chess at the age of 6, and had several coaches including K Visweswaran. He obtained his first two GM norms at the Serbia Open in 2021 and in the Vezerkepzo GM tournament in Budapest, Hungary in June 2022.

In August 2022, Pranav  obtained his final norm by winning the Limpedea Open in Baia Mare, Romania championship, becoming the 75th grandmaster from India and the 27th grandmaster from the state of Tamil Nadu.

In October 2022, he played for India in the World U-16 Youth Olympiad (alongside Pranesh M, Harshad S, Rohit S, Mrittika Mallick, and Boramanikar Tanisha S) and the Magnus Carlsen Academy Challenge simultaneously, winning both events. He later won chess24's Challengers Chess Tour by defeating Raunak Sadhwani in the final round.

References

Living people
2006 births
Indian chess players
Chess grandmasters
Sportspeople from Bangalore